This is a list of earthquakes in 2002. Only earthquakes of magnitude 6 or above are included, unless they result in damage and/or casualties, or are notable for some other reason.  All dates are listed according to UTC time.

Compared to other years

Overall

By death toll

 Note: At least 10 casualties

By magnitude

 Note: At least 7.0 magnitude

By month

January 

Killing 3 people
 A magnitude 4.7 earthquake struck the Lac Kivu region of the Democratic Republic of the Congo on 15 January. 7 people were killed.
 A magnitude 4.6 earthquake struck Manisa, Turkey on January 21 at a depth of 10.0 km (6.2 mi). One person was killed in Izmir.
One person died from a heart attack in Turkey.

February 

 A magnitude 6.0 earthquake struck Çay, Turkey on February 3 at a depth of 10.0 km (6.2 mi).
 A magnitude 6.0 earthquake struck Easter Island on February 15 at a depth of 10.0 km (6.2 mi).
 A magnitude 4.9 earthquake struck Lower Silesian Voivodeship, Poland on February 20 at a depth of 1.0 km (0.6 mi). Minor damage occurred in Polkowice, and three people were injured.

March 

April 

 A magnitude 5.1 earthquake struck New York, United States on April 20 at a depth of  km. Shaking was widely felt in the northeast and substantial damage was recorded.
 A magnitude 5.7 earthquake struck Kosovo on April 24 at a depth of 10.0 km (6.2 mi). One person was killed and sixty were injured in Kosovo.
Two people were killed and 56 were injured, with ten villages completely destroyed.
 A magnitude 4.8 earthquake struck Tbilisi, Georgia on April 25 at a depth of 10.0 km (6.2 mi). Seven people were killed and 52 were injured.

May 

 A magnitude 6.2 earthquake struck Yilan, Taiwan on May 15 at a depth of 10.0 km (6.2 mi). One person was killed and another was injured.
 A magnitude 5.5 earthquake struck Tanzania on May 18 at a depth of 10.0 km (6.2 mi). Two people were killed and 690 houses were destroyed.

June 

One person was injured and train services were disrupted in Tokyo.
 A magnitude 6.7 earthquake struck Sola, Vanuatu on June 17 at a depth of 33.0 km (20.5 mi).
 A Magnitude 6.5 earthquake struck Abhar, Iran on June 22 at a depth of 10.0 km (6.2 mi), 261 people were killed and 1,500 People were injured.
 A magnitude 5.2 earthquake struck Kairouan, Tunisia on June 24 at a depth of 10.0 km (6.2 mi). Twelve people suffered injuries, and many houses were damaged in Kairouan.

July 

 A magnitude 6.5 earthquake struck The Panama-Costa Rica Border on July 31 At a depth of 10.0 km (6.2 mi), 11 People were injured.

August 

 A magnitude 5.3 earthquake struck Sichuan, China on August 8 at a depth of 33.0 km (20.5 mi). Eight houses were destroyed and 66 damaged in Rulong.
 A magnitude 6.2 earthquake struck Sulawesi, Indonesia on August 15 at a depth of 10.0 km (6.2 mi), 48 people were injured.
It is considered a doublet of the 7.8 earthquake 7 minutes warlier.
 A magnitude 4.4 earthquake struck Cairo, Egypt on August 24 at a depth of 10.0 km (6.2 mi). At least 44 houses were damaged in Cairo.

September 

 A magnitude 6.0 earthquake struck The Gulf of Aden on September 1 at a depth of 10.0 km (6.2 mi).
One person suffered injuries and minor damage occurred in Dudley. The earthquake was felt as far as Cardiff, Wales.

October 

 A magnitude 6.7 earthquake struck Cabo San Lucas, Mexico on October 3 at a depth of 10.0 km (6.2 mi).
 A magnitude 7.6 earthquake struck Papua, Indonesia on October 10 at a depth of 10.0 km (6.2 mi), 8 people were killed and a  High Tsunami Was Formed.
 A magnitude 6.1 earthquake struck Wallis and Futuna on October 13 At a depth of 10.0 km (6.2 mi).
 A magnitude 6.1 earthquake struck The Pacific-Antarctic Ridge on October 18 at a depth of 10.0 km (6.2 mi).
 A magnitude 6.2 earthquake struck Goma, Democratic Republic of the Congo on October 24 at a depth of 11.0 km (6.8 mi). Two people were killed and moderate damage occurred throughout Congo and Rwanda.
 A magnitude 4.3 earthquake struck Sicily, Italy on October 29 at a depth of 10.0 km (6.2 mi). Nine people were injured and dozens of buildings were damaged in Santa Venerina.

November 

This was a foreshock of The 2004 Indian Ocean earthquake.
 A magnitude 6.3 earthquake struck Baltistan, Pakistan on November 20 at a depth of 33.0 km (20.5 mi), 23 people were killed.
 A magnitude 5.9 earthquake struck Merelava, Vanuatu on November 27 at a depth of 33.0 km (20.5 mi). Three people were injured and a hundred buildings were damaged on Merelava.

December 

Two people were killed, and 13,380 houses were damaged in Yumen. 
 A magnitude 6.3 earthquake struck Tabina, Philippines on December 23 At a depth of 10.0 km (6.2 mi).
Fifteen people were injured and around 3,000 homes damaged in Kermanshah.

References

2002
 
2002 natural disasters
2002